"This Is Gonna Hurt" is the first single from Hoobastank's album Fight or Flight, released on May 3, 2012. According to lead vocalist Doug Robb, the song is about the ending of a romantic relationship.

Charts

References

2012 songs
Hoobastank songs
Songs written by Dan Estrin
Songs written by Doug Robb
Songs written by Chris Hesse
Song recordings produced by Gavin Brown (musician)